The Votkinsk Hydroelectric Station (Russian: Воткинская ГЭС) is a dam and hydroelectric power station on the Kama River along the border of Perm Krai and Udmurtia, Russia. The power station has a 1,100 MW installed capacity and the dam also supports a ship lift. Construction on the dam began in 1955, the first generator was operational in 1961 and the last in 1963. The entire project was complete in 1965.

Design
The concrete structures of the dam, namely the spillway and power station comprise .

It contains 10 Kaplan turbine-generators. There are six transformers ranging from 110-500 kV.

See also

Nizhnekamsk Hydroelectric Station

References

Hydroelectric power stations built in the Soviet Union
Hydroelectric power stations in Russia
Dams in Russia
Dams completed in 1965
Dams on the Kama River